Cacophis harriettae, also known as the white-crowned snake or white-naped snake, is a species of venomous elapid snake endemic to Australia. The specific epithet harriettae honours natural history illustrator Harriet Scott, who illustrated Gerard Krefft's The Snakes of Australia, including this species.

Description
The species grows to an average of 40 cm, and a maximum of 56 cm, in length. The upper body is dark grey to black, with broad white bands extending from the snout along the sides of the head to meet at the nape.

Behaviour
The species is oviparous, with an average clutch size of five (range 2–10). It feeds on lizards and reptile eggs.

Distribution and habitat
The species' distribution extends from Mount Abbott, near Proserpine in eastern Queensland, south-eastwards to north-eastern New South Wales. It occurs in moist habitats, including rainforests and wet sclerophyll forests as well as suburban gardens.

References

 
harriettae
Snakes of Australia
Reptiles of Queensland
Reptiles of New South Wales
Taxa named by Gerard Krefft
Reptiles described in 1869